Przemków  is a town in Polkowice County, Lower Silesian Voivodeship, in western Poland. It is the seat of the administrative district called Gmina Przemków.

As of 2019, the town has a population of 6,107.

Przemków gives its name to the nearby protected area called Przemków Landscape Park.

Notable people
 Adolf Ernst (1832–1899), scientist
 Albert, Duke of Schleswig-Holstein (1869–1931), died at Primkenau palace 
 Ernst Gunther, Duke of Schleswig-Holstein (1863–1921), died at Primkenau palace

References

Cities and towns in Lower Silesian Voivodeship
Polkowice County